Faqirwala is a village in the Punjab of Pakistan.

Populated places in Muzaffargarh District